Ködnitz is a municipality in the district of Kulmbach in Bavaria in Germany.

Municipal division

Ködnitz is arranged in the following boroughs:

 Ebersbach
 Fölschnitz
 Forstlasmühle
 Haaghof
 Hauenreuth
 Heinersreuth
 Höllgraben
 Kauerndorf
 Ködnitz
 Leithen
 Listenberg
 Meierhof
 Mühlberg
 Pinsenhof

References

Kulmbach (district)